Riddleville is an unincorporated community in Crawford and Lawrence counties, Illinois, United States.

References

Unincorporated communities in Crawford County, Illinois
Unincorporated communities in Lawrence County, Illinois
Unincorporated communities in Illinois